The Fraternitas Rosicruciana Antiqua (FRA) is a Rosicrucian Order originally established by German occultist Dr. Arnold Krumm-Heller, and acts in Brazil and Spanish-speaking countries. In Brazil, it was established in 1932 and has had its headquarters in Rio de Janeiro since 1933. The Brazilian FRA is associated with Fraternitas Rosae Crucis (FRC), a Rosicrucian fraternity with its headquarters in U.S., and with the Ecclesia Gnostica, its ecclesiastical branch.

References
Much of the content of this article comes from the equivalent Portuguese-language Wikipedia article.

External links
http://rosacruzantiqua.wordpress.com
http://www.fra.org.br
https://www.fravenezuela.com/

Organizations established in 1932
Rosicrucian organizations